Ümit Tütünci (born 1 May 1984) is a Turkish former professional footballer who played as a forward.

References

External links
 

1984 births
Sportspeople from Trabzon
Living people
Turkish footballers
Association football forwards
Hacettepe S.K. footballers
Karşıyaka S.K. footballers
Orduspor footballers
Gençlerbirliği S.K. footballers
Kartalspor footballers
Gaziantepspor footballers
Giresunspor footballers
Kayseri Erciyesspor footballers
Boluspor footballers
TKİ Tavşanlı Linyitspor footballers
Adanaspor footballers
Denizlispor footballers
Göztepe S.K. footballers
Elazığspor footballers
Manisa FK footballers
Süper Lig players
TFF First League players
TFF Second League players
TFF Third League players